NSR can refer to:

Politics and government
 Federation of Northern Syria – Rojava
 Naval Service Reserve, Ireland
 Norwegian Sami Association
 National Security Review (1989–1993), a US  national security directive

Transportation and vehicles
 Airbus NSR, a passenger aircraft
 Honda NSR series of motorcycles
 North Staffordshire Railway
 Northern Sea Route, a shipping route along the Arctic coast of Siberia, from Kara Sea to Bering Strait
 Nova Scotia Railway

Sports and recreation
 NASCAR SimRacing, a computer game
 National Student Rodeo, a kayak sporting event
 Northside Rollers, an Australian roller derby league
 No Straight Roads, an action-adventure video game
 National Schools' Regatta, a rowing regatta in Great Britain

Other
 Net smelter return, a mining business term
 Normal sinus rhythm, of the heart
 North Sea Region
 Notch tensile strength of a material

See also